Rohanixalus hansenae, also known as Hansen's Asian treefrog, Hansen's bushfrog, and Chon Buri pigmy tree frog, is a species of frog in the family Rhacophoridae. As its range is currently known, it is endemic to Thailand, although it is likely that its true range extends into Myanmar, Cambodia, and Laos. The nominal species consists of two lineages that may represent distinct species. The specific name hansenae honours Dora Hansen, friend of Doris Mable Cochran who described this species. Formerly described in Feihyla, it was moved to the new genus Rohanixalus in 2020 following a phylogenetic study.

Rohanixalus hansenae occurs in association with riparian vegetation around ponds in lowland forest and up to around above sea level. Reproduction occurs in the rainy season. Egg clutches are deposited on vertical surfaces of boulders and plants above water, occasionally away from water in areas that get subsequently flooded. It is probably threatened by habitat loss (deforestation) occurring in its distribution area. It is present in a number of protected areas.

References

hansenae
Frogs of Asia
Amphibians of Thailand
Endemic fauna of Thailand
Taxa named by Doris Mable Cochran
Amphibians described in 1927
Taxonomy articles created by Polbot